Emily Barker (b. 1992, San Diego, CA) is a multidisciplinary artist based in Los Angeles.

Artistic practice and exhibitions 
Barker's work examines and challenges ableism embedded into contemporary society.

In 2020, Murmurs, an art space in Los Angeles, California, presented Barker's first solo show titled Built to Scale.

Barker is participating in the 2022 Whitney Biennial titled "Quiet as It's Kept" curated by Adrienne Edwards and David Breslin.

Barker studied at the School of the Art Institute of Chicago.

Barker is a wheelchair user and chronically ill. In addition to making art, Barker has worked as a model.

References

External links 
 The Creative Independent - On accessibility - Emily Barker interview - 2020
 Artillery Mag - A Conversation with Emily Barker - 2021

American contemporary artists
Living people
21st-century American artists
21st-century American women artists
Year of birth missing (living people)